

List

References

R